Rene Schramm is a paralympic athlete from Germany competing mainly in category T37 sprint events.

Rene competed at the 1996 Summer Paralympics in the 100m, 200m and long jump but was unable to finish in the top three.  In 2000 he competed in the 100m, 4 × 100 m and won a bronze medal in the long jump.  This would prove to be his only medal as he missed the 2004 games and was unable to medal in either the 100m or 200m in the 2008 Summer Paralympics.

References

Paralympic athletes of Germany
Athletes (track and field) at the 1996 Summer Paralympics
Athletes (track and field) at the 2000 Summer Paralympics
Athletes (track and field) at the 2008 Summer Paralympics
Paralympic bronze medalists for Germany
German male sprinters
German male long jumpers
Living people
Medalists at the 2000 Summer Paralympics
Year of birth missing (living people)
Paralympic medalists in athletics (track and field)